Karolina may refer to:

People
Karolina (name)
Karolina (singer), singer/songwriter from Eilat, Israel

Places
Karolina, Łódź Voivodeship (central Poland)
Karolina, Grodzisk Mazowiecki County in Masovian Voivodeship (east-central Poland)
Karolina, Mińsk County in Masovian Voivodeship (east-central Poland)
Karolina, Piaseczno County in Masovian Voivodeship (east-central Poland)

Ships
HSC Karolina (built 1989), a high speed craft owned and operated by the Croatian shipping company Jadrolinija

See also

Carolina (disambiguation)
Caroline (disambiguation)
Karlina
Karolin (disambiguation)
Karolina-Kolonia, a Polish village